MDGA2 (MAM domain containing glycosylphosphatidylinositol anchor 2) is a human gene. 
It has previously been called MAMDC1.
MDGA2 is located on chromosome 14.

The gene has a homologue in rat and mouse, Mdga2,
and investigations in rats have found that the gene is expressed in the central and peripheral nervous system in a subpopulation of neurons, e.g., in the basilar pons and cerebral cortex.

There are several variants in the human gene,
and a genome-wide association study has pointed to that single-nucleotide polymorphisms in MDGA2 is associated with neuroticism. However, a more recent study has failed to replicate that finding.

References 

Genes on human chromosome 14